Judy Ann Nagel (born August 27, 1951) is a former World Cup alpine ski racer from the United States.

Early years
Born in Seattle, Washington, Nagel was the younger of two daughters of an Olympic ski racer. She learned to ski and race at Stevens Pass when the family lived in Skykomish. When Crystal Mountain began operations in 1962, her father headed the new ski school and race program, and the family relocated to Enumclaw.

Her father, Jack Nagel (1926–2004), was a member of the U.S. alpine team at the 1952 Winter Olympics; he fell in the first run of the slalom and finished 29th in the giant slalom. Born in Port Townsend and raised in Skykomish, Jack was a third-generation logger when skiing was gaining popularity in the 1940s. He later ran the only gas station in Skykomish and was a ski instructor at Stevens Pass until 1962, when the new Crystal Mountain opened near Mount Rainier. His racing school was featured in Sports Illustrated in 1963, with older daughter Cathy, 14, on the cover.

Racing career
Nagel competed in the 1968 Winter Olympics at age 16. Not originally on the World Cup or Olympic teams, Nagel and 18-year-old Kiki Cutter of Oregon were brought over to Europe a few weeks ahead of the Olympics to compete for berths on the U.S. Olympic team, which they both made. Nagel placed eighth and sixth in the two World Cup slaloms immediately preceding the Olympics, and led the Olympic slalom at Chamrousse by eight-hundredths of a second after the first run. U.S. racers seemingly held four of the first six spots after the first run, but the other three Americans were subsequently disqualified for missed gates. With the fastest run that qualified, Nagel was last out of the gate in the second run and missed an early gate. She climbed back up the hill to make the gate, then straddled another and had another spill to cross the finish line well back and was disqualified. Two days later, Nagel was the top U.S. finisher in the giant slalom at 12th place.

Back at her home mountain for the U.S. Alpine Championships, she won the slalom and combined at Crystal Mountain. A few weeks later Nagel gained her first World Cup podium at Heavenly Valley. She finished her first World Cup season eleventh overall, tenth in slalom, and ninth in giant slalom.

In the 1969 season, Nagel gained her first World Cup victory at age 17 (& 5½ months), and remains the youngest-ever American to win an alpine World Cup race. In that first win in Italy, her older sister Cathy was the runner-up. Her other wins were a sweep of the technical events in Lienz, Austria. Nagel's final World Cup race was in March 1970 at age 18; she retired from the circuit later that year to coach and pursue other interests.
During her brief World Cup career, she won three races, attained twelve podiums, and had 29 top ten finishes.

World Cup results

Season standings

Race podiums
 3 wins - (2 slalom, 1 giant slalom)
 12 podiums - (8 slalom, 4 giant slalom)

Olympic results  

^ Leader after first run of slalom
From 1948 through 1980, the Winter Olympics were also the World Championships for alpine skiing.

References

External links
 
 Judy Nagel World Cup standings at the International Ski Federation
 
 

1951 births
Living people
American female alpine skiers
Olympic alpine skiers of the United States
Alpine skiers at the 1968 Winter Olympics
Skiers from Seattle
People from Enumclaw, Washington
21st-century American women